The 2003 Canarian regional election was held on Sunday, 25 May 2003, to elect the 6th Parliament of the Autonomous Community of the Canary Islands. All 60 seats in the Parliament were up for election. The election was held simultaneously with regional elections in twelve other autonomous communities and local elections all throughout Spain.

Overview

Electoral system
The Parliament of the Canary Islands was the devolved, unicameral legislature of the autonomous community of the Canary Islands, having legislative power in regional matters as defined by the Spanish Constitution and the Canarian Statute of Autonomy, as well as the ability to vote confidence in or withdraw it from a President of the Government. Voting for the Parliament was on the basis of universal suffrage, which comprised all nationals over 18 years of age, registered in the Canary Islands and in full enjoyment of their political rights.

The 60 members of the Parliament of the Canary Islands were elected using the D'Hondt method and a closed list proportional representation, with an electoral threshold of 30 percent of valid votes—which included blank ballots—being applied in each constituency. Alternatively, parties could also enter the seat distribution as long as they reached six percent regionally. Seats were allocated to constituencies, corresponding to the islands of El Hierro, Fuerteventura, Gran Canaria, La Gomera, La Palma, Lanzarote and Tenerife. Each constituency was allocated a fixed number of seats: 3 for El Hierro, 7 for Fuerteventura, 15 for Gran Canaria, 4 for La Gomera, 8 for La Palma, 8 for Lanzarote and 15 for Tenerife.

The electoral law provided that parties, federations, coalitions and groupings of electors were allowed to present lists of candidates. However, groupings of electors were required to secure the signature of at least 1 percent of the electors registered in the constituency for which they sought election. Electors were barred from signing for more than one list of candidates. Concurrently, parties and federations intending to enter in coalition to take part jointly at an election were required to inform the relevant Electoral Commission within ten days of the election being called.

Election date
The term of the Parliament of the Canary Islands expired four years after the date of its previous election. Elections to the Parliament were fixed for the fourth Sunday of May every four years. The previous election was held on 13 June 1999, setting the election date for the Parliament on Sunday, 25 May 2003.

The Parliament of the Canary Islands could not be dissolved before the date of expiry of parliament except in the event of an investiture process failing to elect a regional President within a two-month period from the first ballot. In such a case, the Parliament was to be automatically dissolved and a snap election called, with elected deputies merely serving out what remained of their four-year terms.

Results

Overall

Distribution by constituency

Notes

References

Canary Islands
Regional elections in the Canary Islands
2003 in the Canary Islands
May 2003 events in Europe